Olympia station may refer to:

Olympia railway station, Olympia, Greece
Kensington (Olympia) station, London, England
Centennial Station, Olympia-Lacey, Washington, United States